William Alvin Whitworth (born February 13, 1937) is an American journalist and editor. He worked as a reporter for the New York Herald Tribune from 1963 to 1966, columnist and associate editor for The New Yorker from 1966 to 1980, and editor in chief of The Atlantic from 1981–99.

Career
In 1960, on completion of his BA in English/Journalism at the University of Oklahoma, Whitworth began work at the Arkansas Gazette where he covered low-level community and political stories.
After 4 years at the Gazette, he moved to New York to work as a reporter for the New York Herald Tribune (1963–66), covering the political turmoil of the 1960s beginning with the Kennedy assassination, and including the student antiwar movement, Harlem riots, and Bobby Kennedy's U.S. Senate race. He also reported on entertainment stories, including the Beatles’ first two U.S. appearances.

From 1966 to 1980, he was hired by William Shawn as a columnist for The New Yorker, writing celebrity features, and reporting other entertaining subjects, including making regular contributions to the popular “Talk of the Town” section. At The New Yorker he wrote a long, detailed piece about an interview he conducted with Eugene V. Rostow regarding the strategy, values and purposes of the Vietnam War.

Whitworth began his editing career at The New Yorker, working with such other columnists as Pauline Kael, and writers of contributed pieces. In a 2011 interview with Marc Smirnoff of The Oxford American, he said that one of his most challenging writers was journalist Robert Caro, author of The Power Broker, which was excerpted in the New Yorker in four installments in 1974. The excerpts differ from the version published in the book, as noted by Charles McGrath in a 2012 New York Times profile of Mr. Caro:

When Mort Zuckerman bought The Atlantic in 1981, he made Whitworth editor in chief of the monthly magazine. Whitworth spent almost two decades leading the magazine to numerous awards and commendations.

After his retirement in 1999, he continued to edit occasional pieces, and he also took on assignments as a book editor.

References

External links
 2011 extended interview by Marc Smirnoff - Oxford American

American male journalists
The Atlantic (magazine) people
1937 births
Living people
20th-century American journalists